Arnold Aberman is a Canadian physician who is a pioneer in critical care medicine and a medical administrator.

Early life 
Aberman was born in Montreal Quebec and received his BSc (1965) from McGill University.

Medical career 
Aberman obtained his MD from McGill University with specializations in internal medicine and pulmonary disease. He completed residencies at the Royal Victoria Hospital and the Albert Einstein College of Medicine.

Aberman trained in California at the Cardiovascular Research Institute of UCSF and was a research fellow in the Shock Research Unit of the University of Southern California.

Aberman returned to Canada in 1973 to become director of the Intensive Care Unit at Mt Sinai Hospital in Toronto, Ontario. From 1977 to 1987, he took on additional responsibilities as Physician-in-Chief at Mt Sinai Hospital. He became Professor of Medicine at the University of Toronto in 1980.

In 1987, Aberman was appointed Physician-in-Chief of the Toronto Hospital, an amalgamation of Toronto General and Toronto Western Hospitals. Aberman's major mandate was to merge the two hospital departments clinically, academically, administratively, and financially. His extraordinary administrative abilities were then turned to the restructuring of Toronto's teaching hospitals.

Aberman was appointed Dean of the Faculty of Medicine of the University of Toronto in 1992. He stepped down as dean in 1999.

Starting in 2002, Aberman facilitated the establishment of the Northern Ontario School of Medicine.

Aberman has over 60 publications in critical care. His citation for the Order of Canada in 2011 stated he "contributed to the advancement of medicine for more than 30 years."

References 

McGill University alumni
Academic staff of the University of Toronto
Living people
Members of the Order of Canada
Canadian medical researchers
Canadian university and college faculty deans
20th-century Canadian physicians
Year of birth missing (living people)